Trialeti  is a mountainous area in central Georgia.  In Georgian, its name means "a place of wandering".  The Trialeti Range is a part of the greater Trialeti Region. It corresponds to the modern-day Tsalka Municipality. 

Geography of Georgia (country)
Former provinces of Georgia (country)
Historical regions of Georgia (country)